Bajo Corral is a corregimiento in Las Tablas District, Los Santos Province, Panama with a population of 483 as of 2010. Its population as of 1990 was 601; its population as of 2000 was 546.

References

Corregimientos of Los Santos Province